Keller Inlet is an ice-filled inlet  long, in a northeast–southwest direction, and  wide, between Cape Little and Cape Fiske, along the east coast of Palmer Land, Antarctica. This inlet was photographed from the air by members of the United States Antarctic Service in December 1940, and in 1947 by members of the Ronne Antarctic Research Expedition under Finn Ronne, who in conjunction with the Falkland Islands Dependencies Survey charted it from the ground. It was amed by Ronne for Louis Keller of Beaumont, Texas, who contributed supplies to Ronne's expedition.

References

Inlets of Palmer Land